The Gulf of Gaeta is a body of water on the west coast of Italy and part of the Tyrrhenian Sea. It is bounded by Cape Circeo in the north, Ischia and the Gulf of Naples in the south, and the Pontine Islands in the west.

The gulf is named for the nearby Italian city of Gaeta. The Volturno is the primary river draining into the gulf.

References

Gaeta
Gaeta
Landforms of Lazio
Landforms of the Tyrrhenian Sea